Martin Maher may refer to:

 Martin Maher (soldier) (1876–1961), American soldier and subject of the 1955 film The Long Gray Line
 Martin Maher (parks commissioner), Brooklyn parks commissioner, New York City

See also
 Martin Maier (1840–1893), American soldier and businessman
 Martin Mayer (1928–2019), American author